Marvelous Antolín Garzón (born 7 January 2003), commonly known as Marvel, is a footballer playing as a defender for Real Madrid Castilla. Born in Morocco, he is a youth international for Spain.

Club career

Early life
Born in Casablanca, Morocco to a Nigerian mother, who brought him to Spain as a baby, Marvel was adopted by a Spanish family at the age of three.

Initially starting his career at Real Madrid, he played for Atlético Madrid, Alcalá and Rayo Vallecano before a return to Real in 2016. A left-footed central defender, he is noted for his imposing frame and ability to move the ball out from the back.

Marvel made three appearances for the Real Madrid Castilla team in October 2021, and was personally praised by Florentino Pérez for his performance in a 0–0 draw with Barcelona B. He has been called up to Real Madrid first team training on a number of occasions.

International career
Despite being born in Morocco, Marvel has a Spanish passport, having lived there for almost all of his life. He has represented Spain at under-19 level.

Career statistics

Club
.

References

External Links 

 Real Madrid profile
 
 
 

2003 births
Living people
Footballers from Casablanca
Spanish footballers
Spain youth international footballers
Spanish people of Nigerian descent
Spanish sportspeople of African descent
Nigerian emigrants to Spain
Naturalised citizens of Spain
Spanish adoptees
Association football defenders
Primera Federación players
Real Madrid CF players
Atlético Madrid footballers
RSD Alcalá players
Rayo Vallecano players
Real Madrid Castilla footballers